Silverlake Life: The View from Here is a 1993 documentary film by director Peter Friedman (not the actor of the same name) and Tom Joslin. Shot with a hand-held video camera, the film documents the final months of a relationship between two gay men — Tom Joslin (November 29, 1946 - July 1, 1990) and his partner, Mark Massi (July 21, 1948 - August 6, 1991) — as they both struggle to deal with AIDS. The journey that Tom and Mark face as two partners dying of AIDS is to demonstrate realistically how their lives changed. Everyday tasks became chores until the last day of Tom's life came upon them. The honest and realistic portrayal allows the audience to see behind the scenes of a person affected by HIV.

The film won several awards including a 1994 Peabody Award. It shared the 1993 Grand Jury Prize at the Sundance Film Festival with the film Children of Fate: Life and Death in a Sicilian Family.

References

External links
 
Silverlake Life homepage
Silverlake Life: The View from Here at POV

1993 films
Documentary films about HIV/AIDS
1993 LGBT-related films
HIV/AIDS in American films
American documentary films
Sundance Film Festival award winners
American LGBT-related films
Silver Lake, Los Angeles
Films shot in Los Angeles
Peabody Award-winning broadcasts
HIV/AIDS in television
1993 documentary films
1990s American films